The Union Block in Oskaloosa, Kansas, is a commercial block building which was built in 1892.  It was listed on the National Register of Historic Places in 1973.

It is a red brick building,  in plan, and is composed of four two-story stores.  It is located at the southwest corner of Delaware and Jefferson Streets in  Oskaloosa.

References

Commercial buildings on the National Register of Historic Places in Kansas
Buildings and structures completed in 1892
Jefferson County, Kansas